Ella Ann Toone (born 2 September 1999) is an English professional footballer who plays as a forward for Women's Super League club Manchester United and England.

Toone has previously played for Manchester City and Blackburn Rovers, and has represented England at under-17, under-19, under-21, and senior levels. Toone scored the first goal in England's 2–1 victory over Germany in the final of UEFA Women's Euro 2022, which brought England their second major tournament victory in international football.

Club career

Manchester City
Toone joined Manchester City in the summer of 2016 from Blackburn Rovers having previously been a youth at Manchester United for six years but moved on due to a lack of senior women's team. She continued to play with Blackburn in the National League on dual registration terms. In July 2016, she made her senior Manchester City debut as a substitute in an 8–0 win over Aston Villa in the Continental Cup.

Toone was nominated alongside four others for the FA Women's Young Player of the Year award in May 2018, an award eventually won by Beth Mead.

Manchester United
 
In July 2018, Toone joined Manchester United for their inaugural season in the FA Women's Championship for the 2018–19 season, one of seven players to return to the senior side having played for the club at youth level. She made her competitive debut for Manchester United, as a half-time substitute for Mollie Green, in a 1–0 League Cup victory against Liverpool on 19 August. On 9 September, she scored her first senior goal, on her league debut, in United's opening game of the 2018–19 season, a 12–0 win away to Aston Villa. She was voted FA Women's Championship player of the month for February 2019, having scored five goals in United's two league games, with four of them scored against Leicester City on 13 February.

In the 2019–20 season, Toone scored five goals in a League Cup group stage game as United beat Leicester City 11–1 on 21 November 2019, equaling the club record set by Jessica Sigsworth the previous season.

Ahead of the 2020–21 season, Toone signed a new two-year contract with an option for a third. Toone finished the season as United's top goal scorer, with ten goals in all competitions.

On 20 November 2021, it was announced that Toone had signed a new contract until June 2025.

On 10 November 2022, Toone signed a further contract extension until June 2026.

International career

Youth
Toone represented England at the 2016 FIFA U-17 Women's World Cup in Jordan.

On 17 October 2017, Toone made her under-19 debut in an UEFA Women's Under-19 Championship qualification match against Kazakhstan, scoring twice in a 9–0 win. She scored 5 across the qualifying campaign as England finished second to Germany in the elite round.

In June 2018, Toone was part of the 35-player shortlist to make the England under-20 squad for the FIFA Women's U20 World Cup, but was ruled out through injury.

Senior
In September 2020, Toone received her first senior national team call-up as part of a 30-player training camp at St George's Park. She made her senior international debut on 23 February 2021 as a half-time substitute and scored a penalty in a 6–0 friendly win over Northern Ireland. She scored a hat-trick on 26 October 2021 against Latvia during 2023 FIFA Women's World Cup qualification. 

In June 2022, Toone was included in the England squad for UEFA Women's Euro 2022. She appeared in every match as a substitute, and scored twice. Her first goal was an 84th-minute equaliser against Spain in the quarter-finals to send the game into extra-time, eventually winning 2–1. Her second goal was in the final to give England the lead against Germany in the 62nd minute. England won 2–1 in extra-time, winning the tournament.

Great Britain Olympic
In May 2021, Toone was named to the Team GB squad as one of four reserve players for the delayed Tokyo 2020 Olympics. She was forced to withdraw from the pre-Olympic training camp held for the English players in June 2021 after testing positive for COVID-19. On 1 July 2021, the IOC and FIFA confirmed rosters would be expanded from 18 to 22 meaning the four reserve players would be available for selection to the matchday squad. Toone was named to the bench for the opening group game against Chile and appeared as a stoppage time substitute in the 2–0 win.

Personal life
Born in Tyldesley, Toone attended Fred Longworth High School. After leaving secondary school, whilst playing for Manchester United, Toone enrolled onto a BTEC Level 3 Extended Diploma Sport Science course at Wigan and Leigh College.

Toone is a childhood Manchester United fan, with Cristiano Ronaldo being one of her favourite players.

Toone is in a relationship with former Rochdale, Bolton Wanderers and Grimsby Town footballer Joe Bunney.

Career statistics

Club

International

Honours
Manchester City
 FA WSL Cup: 2016

Manchester United
 FA Women's Championship: 2018–19

England U17
 UEFA Women's Under-17 Championship third place: 2016

England

UEFA Women's Championship: 2022
Arnold Clark Cup: 2022, 2023

Individual
 FA Women's Super League Player of the Month: December 2021
 FA Women's Super League Top Assist Provider: 2021–22
 FA Women's Championship Player of the Month: February 2019
 Manchester United Player of the Year: 2021–22
Freedom of the City of London (announced 1 August 2022)

References

External links

 Profile at the Manchester United F.C. website
 Profile at the Football Association website
 
 

1999 births
Living people
People from Tyldesley
Footballers from Wigan
English women's footballers
Women's association football forwards
Manchester City W.F.C. players
Manchester United W.F.C. players
Blackburn Rovers L.F.C. players
Women's Super League players
England women's under-21 international footballers
England women's international footballers
UEFA Women's Euro 2022 players
Olympic footballers of Great Britain
Footballers at the 2020 Summer Olympics
UEFA Women's Championship-winning players